Yun-seok, also spelled Yoon-seok or Yun-suk, is a Korean masculine given name. Its meaning depends on the hanja used to write each syllable of the name. There are 16 hanja with the reading "yoon" and 20 hanja with the reading "seok" on the South Korean government's official list of hanja which may be registered for use in given names.

People with this name include:
Hwang Yun-suk (1929–1961), South Korean female judge
Kim Yoon-seok (born 1967), South Korean actor
Lucid Fall (born Jo Yun-suk, 1975), South Korean singer-songwriter
Jung Yoon-suk (born 1981), South Korean film director
Oh Yun-suk (born 1984), South Korean handball player
Jung Yun-seok (born 2003), South Korean child actor

See also
List of Korean given names

References

External links
Page for the name 윤석 on erumy.com

Korean masculine given names